Winston Steinburger and Sir Dudley Ding Dong is an animated children's television series created by Mike Geiger. The series follows the intergalactic adventures of a 12-year-old boy named Winston Steinburger and his best friend, a cat named Dudley.

It was first announced in 2014 as a joint co-production of Teletoon and ABC Me, then sold to other broadcasters.

On 31 December 2019, Hasbro acquired Entertainment One for a $3.8 billion deal, making the series under the ownership of Hasbro.

Characters

Main 
 Winston Steinburger (voiced by Deven Mack), an adventurous 12-year-old.
 Sir Dudley Ding Dong (voiced by Ryan Belleville), Winston's cat, who is loyal but not very intelligent.
 Hampton (voiced by Matt Baram), a more dour and sarcastic person who attempts to control the amount of trouble Win and Dudley get into.

Recurring 
 Cutty (voiced by Mark Edwards), an adoptive grandfather-figure to Winston.  He owns the busy diner that Winston works at.
 Pam the Destroyer (voiced by Evany Rosen), a bored kid who seeks entertainment by messing with people in her planet-sized ship.
 Soda (voiced by Sean Cullen), Pam's robot helper who does all her work.
 Sgt. Sasha Spritz (voiced by Sean Cullen), the leader of the Spacecop Superforce, galactic police force and reality show stars.

Episodes

Broadcast
The series has also aired on Disney XD in Latin America, Pop Max in the United Kingdom and Ireland, and Nickelodeon in the Scandinavia region. Reruns in Canada air on Cartoon Network. It also aired on Pop in Africa.

References

External links
 Winston Steinburger and Sir Dudley Ding Dong at Entertainment One
 Winston Steinburger and Sir Dudley Ding Dong at Sticky Pictures
 Winston Steinburger and Sir Dudley Ding Dong at Teletoon.com
 Winston Steinburger & Sir Dudley Ding Dong at ABC
 Mike Geiger

2010s Australian animated television series
2010s Australian black cartoons
2010s Canadian animated television series
2010s Canadian black cartoons
2010s Canadian comic science fiction television series
2016 Australian television series debuts
2017 Australian television series endings
2017 Canadian television series debuts
2017 Canadian television series endings
Television series by Entertainment One
Australian children's animated comic science fiction television series
Australian children's animated science fantasy television series
Canadian children's animated comic science fiction television series
Canadian children's animated science fantasy television series
Australian Broadcasting Corporation original programming
Teletoon original programming
Canadian flash animated television series
Animated television series about cats
Animated television series about children
English-language television shows